Hillside Cannibals is a 2006 American horror film directed by Leigh Scott and produced by The Asylum. The film is a mockbuster of the film The Hills Have Eyes, another film released around the same month, but its plot also incorporates elements from other films, including Cannibal Holocaust, The Texas Chainsaw Massacre and House of 1000 Corpses.

Plot

In the year 1606, Sawney Bean (Leigh Scott), a ruthless psychopath, earned a notoriety as the world's most brutal serial killer, predating Jack the Ripper and Bloody Bill by several hundred years. In life, Sawney was a cannibal, who captured his victims and literally butchered them, feasting on their corpses afterwards.

His practices are continued in the modern day by his in-bred descendants, who dwell in vast caves in the Mojave Desert and feed on the flesh of passers-by, as a group of teenagers soon discover whilst exploring the steep cliff-face where Sawney's descendants dwell in search of flesh.

Cast
 Heather Conforto as Linda
 Tom Nagel as Bill
 Katayoun Dara as Tonya
 Vaz Andreas as Callum
 Frank Pacheco as Magnus
 Erica Roby as Rhiana
 Ella Holden as Amber
 Justin Jones as Mark
 Marie Westbrook as Tog
 Thomas Downey as Towart / Mr. Pratt
 Crystal Napoles as Tearlach
 Chriss Anglin as Ted
 Louis Graham as Sheriff Lachlan
 Leigh Scott as Sawney Bean / David
 Brian J. Garland as Balloch

Reception
Dread Central panned Hillside Cannibal, commenting that they found the film so unenjoyable that getting "stupid drunk" through a proposed drinking game "is probably the best way to get through this ordeal." HorrorTalk also heavily criticized the movie, as they felt that the film had several flaws that were due to lazy film making and that the script was "just terrible".

See also
 Death Valley: The Revenge of Bloody Bill - Another horror film by The Asylum based on a real-life killer, in this case, William "Bloody Bill" Anderson.

References

External links
 Hillside Cannibals at The Asylum
 

2006 horror films
2006 direct-to-video films
2006 independent films
The Asylum films
2000s English-language films
American independent films
American slasher films
American serial killer films
Films about cannibalism
2006 films
Films directed by Leigh Scott
2000s American films